The Rockpit is an Australian-based music interview and review website specializing in hard rock, heavy metal and blues. It is notable in that unlike many similar sites it concentrates on interviewing both emerging and 'classic' artists, often in depth, giving it more of a journalistic feel than many of its peers.

History and profile
The Rockpit was established in 2009 and has interviewed many notable musicians including Dave Mustaine, Alice Cooper, David Coverdale, members of Guns N' Roses and many others. It averages at least two interviews a week. It covers musical releases and tours and festivals Internationally with regular Australian, European and US reports. It also supports local artists and gives equal time and space to emerging bands.

In 2016 the website expanded its operations, adding a Podcast and increasing the number of interviews posted to one every two days, it also doubled its number of reporters and photographers. The Rockpit also established its new artist management and event booking arm Krunch Entertainment.

In 2017 the Rockpit opened its online store, selling branded merchandise, unique photographs, and rare signed items from many of the bands it has covered.

References

External links

Music magazines published in Australia
Music review websites
Magazines established in 2009